Mihăiță "Mihai" Lazăr (born 3 November 1986) is a Romanian rugby union player who plays as a prop for Liga Națională de Rugby club SCM Rugby Timișoara. He also played for the Romania national team, The Oaks.

Lazăr made his debut for Romania national team in 2008 against Czech Republic, in a 76-7 win. He played three matches at the 2011 Rugby World Cup, scoring a try against Scotland (24-34) and then collecting accolades in the pages of The New Zealand Herald newspaper.

On 1 June 2013, he clinched his first ever title, winning the Top 14 final with Castres Olympique. He won his second Top 14 title in 2018. In 2019 he moved to the Pro D2 club Oyonnax, for which he played until the end of 2021.

Honours

Club
Castres Olympique
 Top 14 winner 2013, 2018

References

External links

 
 
 
 
 Mihaïta Lazar at Castres Olympique

Sportspeople from Iași
1986 births
Living people
Romanian rugby union players
Rugby union props
București Wolves players
CS Politehnica Iași (rugby union) players
Castres Olympique players
Provence Rugby players
FC Grenoble players
Oyonnax Rugby players
Expatriate rugby union players in France
Romania international rugby union players
Romanian expatriate rugby union players
Romanian expatriate sportspeople in France